The 5th Hong Kong Awards ceremony, honored the best films of 1985 and took place on 6 April 1986, at the Regent International Hotel, Hong Kong. The ceremony was hosted by Winnie Yu, during the ceremony awards are presented in 15 categories. The ceremony was sponsored by City Entertainment Magazine.

Awards
Winners are listed first, highlighted in boldface, and indicated with a double dagger.

The People's Choice Award was a short-lived award presented at the 5th Hong Kong Film Awards. The first and only recipient was Kent Cheng for his role in the 1985 drama Why Me.

References

External links
 Official website of the Hong Kong Film Awards

1986
1985 film awards
1986 in Hong Kong